Charles R. "Monk" Meyer (May 1, 1913August 11, 2001) was the runner-up for the Heisman Trophy in 1935, the first year the trophy was awarded, while playing for the United States Military Academy.

Early life
Monk Meyer was born on May 1, 1913, in West Point, New York, the son of Lieutenant Colonel Hermie Meyer. Meyer grew up at various U.S. Army bases throughout the nation and in the Philippines, accompanying his father's post assignments throughout his military career. The Meyer family relocated to the Lehigh Valley area in time for Monk to play football, basketball, and baseball at Allentown High School in Allentown, Pennsylvania. 

After graduating from Allentown High School, Meyer attended preparatory school at Chestnut Hill Academy in Philadelphia. He enlisted in the U.S. Army on April 25, 1932, and entered the United States Military Academy the following year, in 1933, where he played football for Army for two seasons (1935 and 1936) as a multifaceted player who could run, pass, kick, and play defense. For two seasons under Army head coach Gar Davidson.

Although small in stature at 5 feet 9 inches tall and 150 pounds, Meyer emerged as a college football star.

The touchdown pass

In 1935, against Notre Dame before a capacity crowd of 78,114 in Yankee Stadium, Meyer's 41-yard first quarter touchdown pass and stellar performance in a 6–6 tie first brought him into the national limelight. He was named an All-American and then runner-up to the University of Chicago's Jay Berwanger in the first-ever Heisman Trophy vote that year.

In 1936, Monk had another big day in Yankee Stadium, outdueling famed Columbia passer and future Chicago Bears Hall of Fame quarterback Sid Luckman as the Black Knights prevailed, 27–16, over the Lions.

Military career
Meyer graduated from West Point in 1937 and the Command and General Staff School in 1944 and led troops in the Pacific Theater under the overall command of GEN Douglas MacArthur during World War II and again in Korea, and was wounded twice.  In addition he served in Vietnam and was a Pearl Harbor survivor.

Meyer graduated from the Armed Forces Staff College in 1952 and the Army War College in 1956. After 30 years of military service, he retired on July 31, 1967 as a brigadier general. Meyer died on August 11, 2001, in Hampton, New Hampshire, and was buried at the West Point Cemetery at the United States Military Academy in New York on October 4, 2001.

Accolades
Meyer received the Sports Illustrated Silver Anniversary All-American Award in 1961.

He was inducted into the Lehigh Valley chapter of the National Football Foundation and College Football Hall of Fame in 1983.

Like President Dwight D. Eisenhower and GEN MacArthur before him, the National Football Foundation and College Football Hall of Fame also presented Monk its most prestigious accolade, the Gold Medal Award, in 1987.

During his military career, Meyer was awarded the following valorous medals:

References

External links
Monk Meyer profile at For What They Gave
Monk Meyer video profile at Army Black Knights
Monk Meyer at the National Football Foundation

1913 births
2001 deaths
American football running backs
Army Black Knights football players
Burials at West Point Cemetery
Joint Forces Staff College alumni
Military personnel from Allentown, Pennsylvania
People from West Point, New York
Recipients of the Air Medal
Recipients of the Distinguished Service Cross (United States)
Recipients of the Distinguished Service Medal (US Army)
Recipients of the Legion of Merit
Recipients of the Silver Star
Sportspeople from Allentown, Pennsylvania
United States Army generals
United States Army soldiers
United States Army War College alumni
United States Army Command and General Staff College alumni
United States Army personnel of the Korean War
United States Army personnel of the Vietnam War
United States Army personnel of World War II
United States Military Academy alumni
William Allen High School alumni